The 2013 Northeast Conference baseball tournament began on May 24 and ended on May 26 at FirstEnergy Park in Lakewood, New Jersey.  The league's top four teams finishers competed in the double elimination tournament.  Top seeded  won its first Tournament championship and claimed the Northeast Conference's automatic bid to the 2013 NCAA Division I baseball tournament.

Seeding and format
The top four finishers were seeded one through four based on conference regular season winning percentage.  They then played a double-elimination tournament.

Bracket

All-Tournament Team
The following players were named to the All-Tournament Team.

Most Valuable Player
Jordan Mountford was named Tournament Most Valuable Player.  Mountford was a sophomore outfielder for Bryant.

References

2013 Northeast Conference baseball tournament
Northeast Conference baseball tournament
Tournament
May 2013 sports events in the United States
Baseball in New Jersey
College sports in New Jersey
Lakewood Township, New Jersey
Sports in the New York metropolitan area